Szabolcs Gergely Székely (born June 29, 1985) is a Romanian former footballer who played as a striker . In his career Székely played in the Liga I for Gloria Bistriţa and Poli Timișoara and in the Liga II or Liga III for various teams such as: Unirea Alba Iulia, Unirea Urziceni, CFR Timișoara, UTA Arad or CSM Lugoj, among others.

Honours

Club
Gloria Bistrița II
Divizia C: 2004–05
ACS Recaș
Liga III: 2011–12

External links
 
 

1985 births
Living people
People from Aiud
Romanian sportspeople of Hungarian descent
Romanian footballers
Association football forwards
Liga I players
Liga II players
Liga III players
ACF Gloria Bistrița players
CSM Unirea Alba Iulia players
FC Unirea Urziceni players
FCM Câmpina players
CS Otopeni players
FC Internațional Curtea de Argeș players
FC CFR Timișoara players
ACS Sticla Arieșul Turda players
ACS Poli Timișoara players
FC UTA Arad players
CSM Deva players
CS Național Sebiș players